"Walls" is a song by English singer and songwriter Louis Tomlinson, the fifth and the final single and the title track from his debut studio album of the same name. It was released on 17 January 2020.

Background

Tomlinson said that the song is "about overcoming some of your problems and learning from your mistakes. It's looking back at a certain time of my life and I'm sure there's lots of people who can relate to that idea of being alone and waking up, being used to having someone there, then they're not. It's a bit of, "Oh no, I've fucked it up, yeah. But I've understood that now and I've come back stronger. You learn from your mistakes, and the song is about owning them, putting your hands up and saying 'I know what I did was wrong, but I understand it a bit better now'".

Live strings for the song were recorded at Angel Recording Studios in London. Tomlinson said that when he came to the studio and saw that "there must have been 25 musicians in there, all for my song", it was "a proper tear-jerking moment already and I've never felt a shiver like it".

Tomlinson stated that he loved "the indie sound of the song" and its "circular nature – it opens and closes with the same lyric". Tomlinson also claimed to lift parts of Oasis songs - "Cast No Shadow", "Stop Crying Your Heart Out" and "Acquiesce", crediting Oasis songwriter Noel Gallagher.

Critical reception 
Mike Nied of Idolator described the song as "an ode to perseverance and overcoming the odds", "a string-led gem with a thoughtful message [on which] Louis sings about overcoming obstacles between him and a loved one". Writing for MTV, Madeline Roth called "Walls" "an emotional declaration of strength" on which Tomlinson "acknowledges the struggles he's faced with introspective, heartbreaking observations", "cracks the sadness open and lets a little light in by revealing that the hard times have made him a stronger man", and praised the addition of a live orchestra to the song which "ups the emotional ante" and "takes this ballad to beautiful heights". Charu Sinha of Vulture called the track "slow and introspective",  "easy listening, lonely pop rock reminiscent of the 2000s (think early Green Day, but with an inspirational, self-help slant)". Phil Arnold of Music Talkers called "Walls" "a very good song, with all the components that will appeal to a wide demographic" and praised its "smart production" and Tomlinson's "accomplished song-writing" and "mature vocal".

Music video
The music video, directed by Charlie Lightening, and filmed in Morocco, was released on 20 January 2020. The video begins with Tomlinson roaming the Moroccan desert where he encounters a mysterious door, walks through a series of glass panes and sits on a chair perched halfway up a brick wall (a reference to a music video for "Live Forever" by Oasis whose former member Noel Gallagher is credited as one of the co-writers on "Walls"). After Tomlinson enters through the door, he sprawls out on the floor of a ballroom near dancing guests and wanders through a crowd of masked strangers. At the song's climax, he and his band perform on a glowing platform as the light dims.

Live performances 
Tomlinson performed the track for the first time live on 22 January 2020 on The One Show. On 30 January 2020 Tomlinson performed the song on The Tonight Show Starring Jimmy Fallon. On 31 January 2020 he performed it on The Today Show.

Charts

Release history

References

2020 songs
2020 singles
Louis Tomlinson songs
Songs written by Louis Tomlinson
Songs written by Jamie Hartman
Songs written by Noel Gallagher
Songs written by Jacob Manson
Songs written by Dave Gibson (Scottish singer-songwriter)